Walter Sooy Jeffries (October 16, 1893, Atlantic City, New Jersey – October 11, 1954, Margate City, New Jersey) was an American Republican Party politician who represented New Jersey's 2nd congressional district in the United States House of Representatives from 1939-1941.

Biography
Jeffries was born in Atlantic City, New Jersey on October 16, 1893 and attended the local public schools. He graduated from the Atlantic City Business College in 1909 and was also graduated in celestial navigation from the Franklin Institute in Philadelphia in 1943. He engaged in the manufacture of paint from 1910-1934.

He was elected as mayor of Margate City, New Jersey from 1931–1935 and served as sheriff of Atlantic County, New Jersey from 1935-1938. He became engaged in the hotel business at Atlantic City in 1938.

Jeffries was elected as a Republican to the Seventy-sixth Congress, serving in office from January 3, 1939 – January 3, 1941, and was an unsuccessful candidate for reelection in 1940 to the Seventy-seventh Congress.

After his term in Congress, he was treasurer of Atlantic County from 1941-1944. Jeffries died in Margate City on October 11, 1954 and was interred in Laurel Memorial Cemetery in Egg Harbor Township, New Jersey.

External links

Walter Sooy Jeffries at The Political Graveyard

1893 births
1954 deaths
Mayors of places in New Jersey
Politicians from Atlantic City, New Jersey
People from Margate City, New Jersey
Republican Party members of the United States House of Representatives from New Jersey
New Jersey sheriffs
20th-century American politicians